A standing crop is the total biomass of the living organisms present in a given environment. This includes both natural ecosystems and agriculture.

See also
 Net Primary Production

Bibliography
 
 Boudouresque CF (1973) Les peuplements sciaphiles  ; Recherches de bionomie analytique, structurale et expérimentale sur les peuplements benthiques sciaphiles de Méditerranée occidentale (fraction algale). Bulletin du Muséum d'histoire naturelle, 33, 147, PDF, 80 pages.
 Campbell, Reece, Urry, Cain, et al. (2011) 9th ed. Biology. Benjamin Cummings. pg 1221
 Fausch, K. D., Hawkes, C. L., & Parsons, M. G. (1988). Models that predict standing crop of stream fish from habitat variables: 1950-85 (http://www.treesearch.fs.fed.us/pubs/8730 résumé]).
 
 Jenkins, R. M. (1968). The influence of some environmental factors on standing crop and harvest of fishes in US reservoirs.

References

External links
Models that predict standing crop of stream fish from habitat variables: 1950-85

Habitats
Ecosystems
Ecological metrics